Barinder Kumar Goyal Vakeel is an Indian politician and the MLA representing the Lehra Assembly constituency in the Punjab Legislative Assembly. He is a member of the Aam Aadmi Party. He has contested the election in 1992 but lost to Rajinder Kaur Bhatthal. But in 2022, against him Bibi Rajinder Kaur Bhatthal, ex CM, was not able to save her deposit money. He defeated S. Parminder Singh Dhindsa, sitting MLA and ex. cabinet minister, Bibi Rajinder Kaur Bhatthal, ex CM and S. Gobind Singh Longowal, ex President of SGPC ex cabinet Minister with a huge margin. He is chairman of committee on subordinate legislation. He is known for his words and his social services. Before this, Barinder Kumar Goyal has made a local level social manch named as Lehra Vikas Manch (LVM). LVM contested the elections of municipal council of Lehra in Feb 2021 and surprised the Punjab with the results. During these elections, perhaps Lehra was the only municipality in Punjab, where the ruling party was not able to prove the majority.  He was elected as the MLA in the 2022 Punjab Legislative Assembly election.

Member of Legislative Assembly
The Aam Aadmi Party gained a strong 79% majority in the sixteenth Punjab Legislative Assembly by winning 92 out of 117 seats in the 2022 Punjab Legislative Assembly election. MP Bhagwant Mann was sworn in as Chief Minister on 16 March 2022.
Committee assignments of Punjab Legislative Assembly
Chairman (2022–23) Committee on Subordinate Legislation

Electoral performance

References 

Living people
Punjab, India MLAs 2022–2027
Aam Aadmi Party politicians from Punjab, India
Year of birth missing (living people)
People from Sangrur district